In Zambia, the Zambia Revenue Authority, a body under the Ministry of Finance, is in charge of collecting taxes on behalf of the Zambian Government. 

Income in Zambia is taxed on the source principle or deemed source basis in some instances. Residents are taxed on domestic source of income and certain types of foreign income, non-residents are normally taxed on Zambian source of income. Zambia has the following direct taxes: Company Income Tax, Personal Income Tax, Withholding Tax, Presumptive Tax and Property Transfer Tax.

Corporate Income 
 Company Income Tax
The general rate is 35 percent for both resident and non-resident companies. For companies involved in agriculture, manufacture of chemical fertilizer and non-traditional exports, the rate is 15 percent while that for mining is 30  percent and 40 percent on bank profits above K250 million

Reduced Rates and Suspension of Corporate Income Tax on profits from manufacturing of ceramic products. The table below gives a breakdown of the 2022 tax rates.

Reintroduction of tax incentives for companies operating Multi Facility Economic Zone (MFEZ) or Industrial Parks. The table below gives a breakdown of the Incentives

Mineral Royalty 
In 2022, for Mining Companies, the deductibility of mineral royalty for corporate income tax assessment purposes was reintroduced.

Import Taxes on Mining Equipment and Machinery 
In September 2022, under Statutory Instrument (SI) No. 50 of 2022, the government offered additional tax exemptions by suspending import taxes on mining equipment and machinery.

Personal Income Tax 
 Personal Income Tax
All individuals are liable to tax on personal income after deducting personal relief at a graduated rate from 0 percent for incomes of K39600 per Annum (K3300 per month) and below. The rest at rates of 25 percent, 30 percent and 37.5 percent.

Changes were made to the PAYE tax brackets. The below table shows the breakdown.

Turnover Tax 
Turnover Tax
The rate of 4 percent (from Jan 2019) is charged on business income for small scale businesses below a turnover threshold of K800 million per annum

 Property Transfer Tax
This is charged at the rate of 5 percent of the open market value realised from the sale of any land and building and shares issued by a company incorporated in Zambia.

Withholding Tax 
Withholding Tax
Withholding tax of 10 percent on rental income (final tax) and 20 percent on dividends, interest payments, royalties, commissions, management and consultancy fees and payments to subcontractors. Payments made to non-residents are also subject to withholding tax at 20 percent in all cases except where there is a double taxation agreement in effect Zambia also charges Indirect taxes: Import Duty, Excise Duty and VAT (Value Added Tax). VAT rate is at 16%, with some items being exempted or zero-rated.
The table below gives a breakdown of the Withholding Tax rate reforms.

Value Added Tax 
Value Added Tax on Goods and Services is rated at 16% unless otherwise specified.

In September 2022, the UPND government reinstated Diesel and Petrol VAT rate.

The table below gives a breakdown of the VAT rate reforms.

Customs and Excise 
In September 2022, the UPND government reinstated Diesel and Petrol excise duty. In December 2022, the government amended the customs duty rate in Chapter 27 of the Customs and Excise Act Cap 322 from 25% to free rate (0%). This applied to importation of petrol and low Sulphur gas oil and came into effect on 1st January 2023.

The table below gives a breakdown of the Custom and excise rate reforms.

See also 

 Economy of Zambia
 Bank of Zambia
 Zambian Kwacha

References

External links 

 Zambian Central Bank Website
 Zambia Revenue Authority Website

Economy of Zambia